John Finan (10 September 1898 – 24 May 1984) was an Irish Clann na Talmhan politician. A farmer by profession, he first stood for election to Dáil Éireann at the 1948 general election for the Roscommon constituency but was unsuccessful. He was subsequently elected to Seanad Éireann on the Administrative Panel. He was elected to the Dáil at the 1951 general election as a Clann na Talmhan Teachta Dála (TD) for Roscommon. He lost his seat at the 1954 general election.

His eldest daughter, Mary, became a prominent businesswoman.

References

1898 births
1984 deaths
Clann na Talmhan TDs
Clann na Talmhan senators
Irish farmers
Members of the 14th Dáil
Members of the 6th Seanad
Politicians from County Roscommon